Events during the year 2007 in Poland.

Incumbents

Elections

Events

January 
 18 January: Storm Kyrill: 6 fatalities

May 
 3 May: Bączkowski v Poland verdict of a European Court of Human Rights concerning Poland is delivered

July 
 22 July: 26 Polish pilgrims die in an accident on the Rampe de Laffrey in France.

August 
 16 January: Nangar Khel incident in Afghanistan involves Polish soldiers

October 
 27 October: 2007 Polish parliamentary election

Deaths

January 
 23 February: Ryszard Kapuściński, journalist, writer

See also 
 2007 in Polish television

 

pl:2007#Wydarzenia w Polsce